The Minister of Finance of Nigeria is a senior cabinet official in the Nigerian Federal Executive Council. The Finance Minister's directs the Nigerian Ministry of Finance and ensures that it operates in a transparent, accountable and efficient manner to bolster the country's economic development priorities. The Minister is assisted by the Permanent Secretary of the Ministry of Finance, a career civil servant.
The current Nigerian Minister of Finance is Zainab Shamsuna Ahmed appointed on 14 September 2018 in Abuja. Nigerian President Muhammadu Buhari accepted the resignation of his Finance Minister Kemi Adeosun.  Duties of minister 
 Preparation of annual budgetary estimates of revenue and expenditure for the Federal Government.
 Determination of Federal Government fiscal policies.
 Mobilization of domestic and external financial resources for national development purposes. 
 Management of foreign exchange reserves.
 Management of Federal Government revenue. 
 Currency valuation.
 Regulation of the insurance industry
 Revenue allocation management.

Ministers of Finance

See also

Nigerian Ministry of Finance
Federal Ministries of Nigeria

References

 Official Website - Federal Ministry of Finance
 Current Minister of Finance

Finance